Gmina Dzierżoniów is a rural gmina (administrative district) in Dzierżoniów County, Lower Silesian Voivodeship, in south-western Poland. Its seat is the town of Dzierżoniów, although the town is not part of the territory of the gmina.

Neighbouring gminas
Gmina Dzierżoniów is bordered by the towns of Bielawa, Dzierżoniów, Pieszyce and Piława Górna, and by the gminas of Łagiewniki, Marcinowice, Niemcza, Nowa Ruda, Stoszowice and Świdnica.

Villages
The gmina contains the villages of Albinów, Borowica, Byszów, Dębowa Góra, Dobrocin, Dobrocinek, Jędrzejowice, Jodłownik, Kiełczyn, Kietlice, Kołaczów, Książnica, Marianówek, Mościsko, Myśliszów, Nowizna, Ostroszowice, Owiesno, Piława Dolna, Roztocznik, Tuszyn, Uciechów, Wiatraczyn and Włóki.

Twin towns – sister cities

Gmina Dzierżoniów is twinned with:
 Cekcyn, Poland
 Dolní Čermná, Czech Republic

References

Dzierzoniow
Dzierżoniów County